Donna Britt may refer to:

 Donna Britt (news anchor) (1958–2021), American television news anchor
 Donna Britt (writer), American author and former newspaper journalist